The 2010 Libyan Super Cup was the 14th edition of the Libyan Super Cup, an annual football match contested by the winners of the previous year's Libyan Premier League and Libyan Cup competitions. The match took place on August 6, 2010 at the 11 June Stadium in the capital, Tripoli, contested by league champions Ittihad Tripoli, seeking an eighth successive title, and cup winners Nasr.

Match details

See also 
 2009–10 Libyan Premier League
 2009–10 Libyan Cup

References 

Super Cup, 2010
Libyan Super Cup